Possilpark & Parkhouse railway station serves the Possilpark and Parkhouse areas of Glasgow, Scotland. Services are provided by ScotRail on behalf of Strathclyde Partnership for Transport.

History

The station was one of five built for Maryhill Line project, which was supported by what was then the Strathclyde Passenger Transport Executive and completed by British Rail in December 1993. The route on which the station stands is considerably older though, being opened by the Glasgow, Dumbarton and Helensburgh Railway in 1858 - this would later be used by trains from the West Highland Line to reach the main line at Cowlairs and thus reach Queen Street High Level. The GD&HR's successors the North British Railway built a station to serve Possilpark on the line in 1885, but this was located a short distance west of the present station and was closed to passengers in January 1917 (though goods traffic continued until 1971).

Services

Between Monday and Saturday, there is a half-hourly service eastbound to Glasgow Queen Street and westbound to Anniesland via Maryhill.

Since 18 May 2014, a limited hourly Sunday service now operates on this line from 09:30 to 19:00.

See also
Possil railway station

References

External links

Video footage of Possilpark and Parkhouse Station

Railway stations in Glasgow
Former North British Railway stations
Railway stations in Great Britain opened in 1885
Railway stations in Great Britain closed in 1917
Railway stations in Great Britain opened in 1993
Railway stations served by ScotRail
Reopened railway stations in Great Britain
SPT railway stations